Shegaon Assembly constituency was one of the  constituencies of Maharashtra Vidhan Sabha in the Buldhana district during 1967 and 1972 State elections. It was established in 1951 as then Madhya Pradesh Vidhan Sabha (Assembly) constituency located in Buldhana district.  However it was dissolved for 1957 elections to Bombay state and 1962 elections to Maharashtra.

Since 1978 elections it does not exist and Jalamb Assembly constituency was re-established for the elections from 1978 till 2004.

Member of Legislative Assembly
1951: Khumkar Tukaram Ganpat, Indian National Congress (from Shegaon ( Constituency no 166 of then Madhya Pradesh State ) ) 
1957 : Does not exist
1962 : Does not exist
1967: Dhokne Tulshiram Pandhari, Indian National Congress (from Shegaon ( Constituency no 100 of Maharashtra State ) )
1972: Patil Kashiram Raibhan, Peasants and Workers Party of India (from Shegaon ( Constituency no 100 of Maharashtra State ) )
1978 onwards: Does not exist

See also
 Shegaon
 Khamgaon Assembly constituency
 Jalgaon(Jamod) Assembly constituency

Notes

Former assembly constituencies of Maharashtra
Constituencies established in 1951
1951 establishments in Bombay State
Constituencies disestablished in 1957
1957 disestablishments in India
Constituencies established in 1967
1967 establishments in Maharashtra
Constituencies disestablished in 1978
1978 disestablishments in India